Elachista coniophora is a moth of the family Elachistidae. It is found in California, United States.

The length of the forewings is 4.5-5.5 mm. The ground color of the forewings is light gray with a variable pattern. Females are paler than males but have the same pattern. The hindwings are brownish gray. The underside of the wings is dark gray.

References

Moths described in 1948
coniophora
Moths of North America